Knud Sørensen (10 March 1928 – 26 September 2022) was a Danish writer, poet and novelist.

Born in Hjørring, in 1958 Sørensen settled as a surveyor on Mors. He made his debut as a poet with Eksplosion in 1961.
Since then, his authorship has included poems, essays, novels, biographies, and a radio play. His 1997 novel En tid was awarded the Kritikerprisen by the Danish Publishers Association and Weekendavisen'''s 1997 literature award. Additionally, he has received a number of working grants and funds, including a lifelong grant from the Danish Arts Agency.

 Bibliography SelectedKnud Sørensen  at Bibliografi.dk
 Eksplosion (1961)
 Bondeslutspil (1980/85)
 Marginaljord (1987)
 En tid (1997)
 En befrielse (1999)
 Digterne omkring Limfjorden (2002)
 Kun slutningen mangler'' (2008) (autobiography)

References 

1928 births
2022 deaths
Danish male poets
20th-century Danish poets
20th-century Danish male writers
People from Hjørring
People from Morsø Municipality